Torsten Wadman (born 30 June 1947) is a Swedish biathlete. He competed at the 1972 Winter Olympics and the 1976 Winter Olympics.

References

1947 births
Living people
Swedish male biathletes
Olympic biathletes of Sweden
Biathletes at the 1972 Winter Olympics
Biathletes at the 1976 Winter Olympics
People from Torsby Municipality
20th-century Swedish people